Railroad Flat may refer to:
Railroad apartment
Rail Road Flat, California